Craspedodiscus is a genus of cephalopods in the ammonite superfamily Perisphinctaceae from the mid Early Cretaceous (Hauterivian-Barremian) of Northern Europe and Siberia that lived some 125 Ma.

Craspedodiscus is discoidal with laterally compressed whorls and a narrowly rounded venter, covered with fine ribbing. It is placed in the subfamily Simbirskitinae in the family Olcostephanitidae.

References 

 Treatise on Invertebrate Paleontology, Part L Ammonoidea ; Geological Society of America and Univ of Kansas press, 5th printing, 1990. (p. L350)

Ammonitida genera
Ammonites of Europe
Cretaceous ammonites